Aleksei Ivanovich Bugayev (born 25 August 1981) is a former association footballer who played defender.

Bugayev has previously played for FC Tom' Tomsk, Torpedo Moscow and Lokomotiv Moscow. In 2004, he was included in the Russia national team and played at Euro 2004.

Achievements
 2005 – Russian Super Cup, winner
 2005 – Russian Premier League, 3rd position

External links 
 Profile at RussiaTeam 

Russian footballers
Russia international footballers
Russia under-21 international footballers
1981 births
Living people
Footballers from Moscow
FC Torpedo Moscow players
FC Lokomotiv Moscow players
FC Tom Tomsk players
UEFA Euro 2004 players
FC Khimki players
Russian Premier League players
FC Krasnodar players
Association football defenders